The 2023 CONMEBOL Recopa Sudamericana was the 31st edition of the CONMEBOL Recopa Sudamericana (also referred to as the Recopa Sudamericana), the football competition organized by CONMEBOL between the winners of the previous season's two major South American club tournaments, the Copa Libertadores and the Copa Sudamericana.
 
The competition was contested in two-legged home-and-away format between Brazilian team Flamengo, the 2022 Copa Libertadores champions, and Ecuadorian team Independiente del Valle, the 2022 Copa Sudamericana champions. The first leg was hosted by Independiente del Valle on 21 February 2023 at Estadio Banco Guayaquil in Quito, while the second leg was hosted by Flamengo on 28 February 2023 at Maracanã in Rio de Janeiro. This was the first time that a rematch is going to take place in the Recopa Sudamericana. The two teams met previously in the 2020 Recopa Sudamericana, where Flamengo won 5–2 on aggregate.

Independiente del Valle defeated Flamengo 5–4 on penalties after tied 1–1 on aggregate to win their first Recopa Sudamericana.

Teams

Format
The Recopa Sudamericana is played on a home-and-away two-legged basis, with the Copa Libertadores champions hosting the second leg. If tied on aggregate, the away goals rule would not be used, and 30 minutes of extra time would be played. If still tied after extra time, the penalty shoot-out would be used to determine the winners (Regulations Article 17).

Matches

First leg

Second leg
Gerson and Gabriel Barbosa (Flamengo) were booked after the penalty shoot-out

References

2023
2023 in South American football
2023 in Brazilian football
2023 in Ecuadorian football
CR Flamengo matches
R
R